National Route 118 is a national road in Argentina, in the northwest of Corrientes Province. The road is marked in red in the map.

Cities
The whole length of the road is within Corrientes Province, crossing through the following Departments and cities (over 5,000 people):
Saladas Department, Saladas (km marker 5).
San Roque Department, no cities with more than 5,000 people.
Concepción Department, Santa Rosa (km 63) and Concepción (km 67)
San Miguel Department, San Miguel (km 127) and Loreto (km 167)

History
Originally this road was called National Route 117. By Decree #1595 of 1979, it was ceded to the administration of Corrientes Province. Decree 1715 from 1988 annuls the previous decree and this road became National Route 118 as number 117 had been used on another road near Paso de los Libres in the SE of the province.

References

National roads in Corrientes Province
Tourism in Argentina